3202 may refer to:

3202 Graff asteroid
3202 Woolworth Avenue address of the Gerald R. Ford Birthsite and Gardens
Hirth 3202 two stroke aircraft engine
Nord 3202 aircraft
Thailand Route 3202
The year in the 33rd century